Big Hill is a bounded rural locality in Upper Lachlan Shire to the north of Marulan in the Southern Tablelands of New South Wales, Australia.

The area is characterised with agricultural activities, predominantly grazing, as well as  National Parks. Grazing was first introduced by Hannibal Hawkins Macarthur nephew of John Macarthur, who established a 1000 acre farm, Arthursleigh, at Big Hill in 1819.

By the start of the 20th century, Big Hill boasted a Methodist chapel, school and a post office. Today, only the church remains, and Arthursleigh operates as an agriculture research and teaching centre of the University of Sydney.

Big Hill Post Office opened on 1 November 1869 and closed in 1945.

The main geographical features of Big Hill include Mount Modickmurribar from which the area is named, the Wollondilly River to the east and the Tarlo River National Park to the west.

Big Hill is roughly equivalent to the cadastral parishes of Cookbundoon and Eden Forest in the county of Argyle.

References 

Upper Lachlan Shire
Localities in New South Wales
Southern Tablelands